The 2012 Telavi Open will be a professional tennis tournament played on clay courts. It is the fifth edition of the tournament which is part of the 2012 ITF Women's Circuit. It takes place in Telavi, Georgia on 24–30 September 2012.

WTA entrants

Seeds 

 1 Rankings are as of 17 September 2012.

Other entrants 
The following players received wildcards into the singles main draw:
  Natia Gegia
  Ekaterine Gorgodze
  Oksana Kalashnikova
  Sofia Kvatsabaia

The following players received entry from the qualifying draw:
  Victoria Kan
  Margarita Lazareva
  Anna Shkudun
  Ganna Poznikhirenko

The following player received entry by a Special Exempt:
  Renata Voráčová

The following player received entry by a Special Ranking:
  Ekaterina Dzehalevich

Champions

Singles 

  Elina Svitolina def.  Lesia Tsurenko, 6–1, 6–2

Doubles 

  Réka-Luca Jani /  Christina Shakovets def.  Ekaterina Dzehalevich /  Oksana Kalashnikova, 3–6, 6–4, [10–6]

External links 
 2012 Telavi Open at ITFTennis.com
 Official site

Telavi Open
Telavi Open
2012 in Georgian sport